Michael Gonçalves (born 19 March 1995) is a Swiss professional footballer who plays as a right back for Winterthur.

Club career
Gonçalves started his youth football with Concordia Basel. In 2009 he transferred to Basel and played in their U-16 and U-18 team and a year and a half in their U-21 team before he signed a three-year professional contract and joined their first team. Gonçalves played his first team debut in the Swiss Cup 0–4 away win on 23 August 2014 against CS Italien. In January 2015 it was announced that Gonçalves would be lent out to Wil to gain first team playing experience. After six months Wil took advantage of an option in the contract and took Gonçalves over definitively for nearly CHF 200'000.00.

On the 15 August 2016 Gonçalves transferred to Xamax under trainer Michel Decastel, but despite 15 games in their first team he never became happy there. On 5 July 2017 he transferred back to Wil.

On 26 August 2020, he signed a two-year contract with Winterthur.

International career
Gonçalves was born in Switzerland and is of Portuguese descent. Gonçalves played his debut for the Switzerland U-20 team on 13 April 2014 in the 1–2 home defeat against Poland U-20 team. His third and last game for Switzerland was on 8 September 2015 in the goalless home game against the Italian U-20. The Portugease U-20 also called him up into their team, but although Gonçalves visited their training camp, he never played a game for them.

References

External links
Profile season 2018/19 on the Swiss Football League homepage

1995 births
Footballers from Basel
Swiss people of Portuguese descent
Living people
Swiss men's footballers
Switzerland youth international footballers
Association football fullbacks
Swiss Challenge League players
Swiss Super League players
FC Basel players
FC Wil players
Neuchâtel Xamax FCS players
Servette FC players
FC Winterthur players